Karl-Wilhelm Hofmann (24 March 1921 – 26 March 1945) was a German Luftwaffe military aviator and fighter ace during World War II who is credited with 44 aerial victories, which were achieved during 260 combat missions. All but one of his victories were claimed over the Western Front and in Defence of the Reich.

Born in Reichelsheim, Hofmann grew up in the Weimar Republic and then in Nazi Germany. He joined the military service in the Luftwaffe and was trained as a fighter pilot. After his flight training, he was posted to Jagdgeschwader 26 "Schlageter" (JG 26—26th Fighter Wing) in June 1942. Flying with this wing, Hofmann claimed his first aerial victory on 11 October 1942 on the Western Front over a Royal Air Force fighter aircraft. In early 1943, elements of JG 26 were moved to the Eastern Front where Hofmann claimed one Soviet aircraft destroyed. His unit redeployed to the Western Front in June 1943. In February 1944, he was appointed squadron leader of 8. Staffel (8th squadron) of JG 26 and was awarded the Knight's Cross of the Iron Cross on 24 October 1944 for 40 aerial victories claimed. In January 1945, he was transferred to take command of 5. Staffel of JG 26. On 26 March 1945, Hofmann was killed in action by friendly fire.

Early life
Hofmann was born on 24 March 1921 in Reichelsheim, in the People's State of Hesse.

World War II
World War II in Europe began on Friday 1 September 1939 when German forces invaded Poland. On 11 June 1942, Hofman was transferred from the Ergänzungs-Jagdgruppe West, a supplementary training unit for fighter pilots destined to fight on the Western Front, to 1. Staffel of Jagdgeschwader 26 "Schlageter" (JG 26—26th Fighter Wing), a squadron of the I. Gruppe. At the time, I. Gruppe was commanded by Hauptmann Johannes Seifert while 1. Staffel was headed by Oberleutnant Josef Haiböck. The Gruppe was equipped with the Focke Wulf Fw 190 A series and based at Saint-Omer-Arques, fighting the Royal Air Force (RAF). On 11 October, the RAF Fighter Command targeted Saint-Omer with multiple "Rodeos". He sustained severe injuries and was hospitalized for many months.

Eastern Front

Following a lengthy period of convalescence, Hofmann returned to 1. Staffel on 31 March 1943. I. Gruppe of JG 26 had been ordered to the Eastern Front in late January 1943 as part of the plan to exchange JG 26 with Jagdgeschwader 54 (JG 54—54th Fighter Wing). At the time of Hofmann's return to his unit, the Gruppe was based at Dno and fighting in the vicinity of Demyansk in support of the 16th Army and 18th Army. He claimed his only aerial victory on the Eastern Front on 14 May when he shot down a Lavochkin-Gorbunov-Gudkov LaGG-3 fighter in combat east of Bryansk. In late May, Major Seifert was replaced by Major Fritz Losigkeit as commander of I. Gruppe. On 6 June, the Gruppe started relocating back to the Western Front, at first to Warsaw, and then to Brandenburg-Briest and Rheine. Before, the relocation was completed, Losigkeit was replaced by Hauptmann Karl Borris as Gruppenkommandeur of I. Gruppe.

Western Front
The Gruppe arrived in France on 10 June and was based at an airfield at Poix-de-Picardie. Hofmann was transferred from 1. Staffel to 10. Staffel on 28 September. Commander of 10. Staffel was Hauptmann Rudolf Leuschel, the Staffel was renamed on 1 October and from then on was known as 8. Staffel and a squadron of III. Gruppe commanded by Major Klaus Mietusch. On 18 October, the United States Army Air Forces (USAAF) targeted Düren, but the attacking bombers were recalled over the North Sea due to bad weather. The attack force was accompanied by numerous Lockheed P-38 Lightning, Republic P-47 Thunderbolt and Spitfire fighters which had the mission to clear the coastal area of Luftwaffe fighters. III. Gruppe encountered the Spitfires from No. 132 Squadron near Béthune. In this encounter, Hofmann claimed a Spitfire shot down near Ardes.

On 4 January 1944, the USAAF Eighth and Ninth Air Force, together with the RAF Second Tactical Air Force, attacked multiple V-1 flying bomb sites as well as Luftwaffe airfields in Germany and German-occupied territory. In support of this mission, two Spitfires from  No. 501 Squadron were on a reconnaissance mission, photographing the target at Ligescourt. Hofmann shot down one of the Spitfires which crashed near Rue. Three days later, the USAAF Eighth Air Force bombed the IG Farben chemical plant at Ludwigshafen. On 11 January, Hofmann was credited with a endgültige Vernichtung (final destruction), a coup de grâce inflicted on an already damaged heavy bomber. While, the 2nd Air Division and most of the 3rd Air Division were recalled due to worsening weather conditions, the 1st Air Division successfully bombed the Focke Wulf factory at Oschersleben. On 28 January 1944, Hofmann shot down a RAF No. 2 Squadron P-51 tactical reconnaissance aircraft near Abbeville. The next day, he claimed his third heavy bomber destroyed, a B-17 bomber shot down north of Lutrebois. That day, the USAAF had attacked targets in the greater Frankfurt area. On 12 April, Hofmann claimed his fifth heavy bomber destroyed when he shot down a B-24.

Squadron leader
On 25 February 1944, the Staffelkapitän of 8. Staffel, Hauptmann Rudolf Leuschel, was killed in action. The following day, Hofmann succeeded Leuschel as commander of 8. Staffel. On 8 June, two days after the Normandy landings, he claimed three USAAF fighters shot down in combat in the vicinity of Caen. Hofmann received the German Cross in Gold on 22 July. At the time, he was credited with 26 aerial victories, 13 of which following the Normandy invasion. On 21 September, during the Battle of Arnhem, Hofmann shot down an unarmed Douglas C-47 Skytrain transport aircraft on a mission to drop reinforcements for the British 1st Airborne Division.

On 21 October, Hofmann, who was flying a Fw 190 A-9, was slightly wounded in combat with a P-38 from the 474th Fighter Group south of Viersen. The next day, he was again injured in ground accident while examining a removed aerial machine gun. The bolt closed unexpectedly, striking him in the left eye. He retained sight but lost the ability to focus. Refusing hospitalization, he continued flying combat missions wearing an eyepatch. Temporarily, command of his 8. Staffel was passed on to Leutnant Wilhelm Mayer. Hofmann received the Knight's Cross of the Iron Cross two days later.

Oberleutnant Heinz-Gerhard Vogt, the Staffelkapitän of 5. Staffel, was killed in action 14 January 1945. The next day, Hofmann was transferred to the II. Gruppe, at the time under the command of Major Anton Hackl, to take command of 5. Staffel while officially retaining command of his 8. Staffel until 15 February. Hofmann claimed his 44th and last aerial victory on 26 March 1945. His opponent was Warrant Officer C. A. Ligtenstein flying a Hawker Tempest from No. 33 Squadron. Ligtenstein safely bailed out following combat southeast of Münster. Shortly later, Hofmann was also shot down in his Fw 190 D-9, presumably by a Luftwaffe pilot from I. Gruppe. He managed to bail out, the altitude was too low for his parachute to fully deploy and he fell to his death. His body was recovered on 2 April near Haselünne. Oberfähnrich Erich Schneider was charged with shooting Hofmann down and tried at the headquarters of the 14th Air Division, but was acquitted.

Summary of career

Aerial victory claims
Mathews and Foreman, authors of Luftwaffe Aces — Biographies and Victory Claims, researched the German Federal Archives and found records for 44 aerial victories claimed 260 combat missions. This figure includes one aerial victories on the Eastern Front and 43 over the Western Allies, including six four-engined bombers.

Victory claims were logged to a map-reference (PQ = Planquadrat), for example "PQ 35 Ost 44184". These sectors were then subdivided into 36 smaller units to give a location area 3 × 4 km in size.

Awards
 German Cross in Gold on 23 July 1944 as Leutnant in the 8./Jagdgeschwader 26
 Knight's Cross of the Iron Cross on 24 October 1944 as Oberleutnant of the Reserves and pilot in the 8./Jagdgeschwader 26 "Schlageter"

Notes

References

Sources

 
 
 
 
 
 
 
 
 
 
 
 
 
 

1921 births
1945 deaths
People from Odenwaldkreis
Luftwaffe pilots
German World War II flying aces
Recipients of the Gold German Cross
Recipients of the Knight's Cross of the Iron Cross
Luftwaffe personnel killed in World War II
Aviators killed by being shot down
Military personnel killed by friendly fire
Friendly fire incidents of World War II
Military personnel from Hesse